The Archbishop's School is a mixed-ability Church of England secondary school and sixth form located on a parkland site on the outskirts of Canterbury, Kent, England. It is a school for pupils and students of all abilities from the ages of 11 to 19, and has approximately 850 pupils. The school was founded in 1958.

The Archbishop's School is situated on St Stephens's Hill, in the village of Hackington (not to be confused with the civil parish of the same name), approximately a mile North-West of the city centre. The Rector of Hackington (St Stephen's) is an ex officio Governor of the school, and since 2014 has also held the office of school chaplain (prior to 2014 this was a separate appointment).

It has six houses named Matthew, Mark, Luke, and John, after the four Evangelists, and two others, Paul and Peter, named after the apostles of those names.

Learning Support/Student Support 
The school has a special VI (Visual Impairment) team with equipment catered to the student such as a Braille typewriter. It also has students with SpLDs (Specific Learning Difficulties) such as Dyslexia, Autism, and ADHD.

Notable Former Pupils 

Hugh Bernard - English cricketer

References

External links
Archbishop's School

Schools in Canterbury
Secondary schools in Kent
Church of England secondary schools in the Diocese of Canterbury
Foundation schools in Kent
Educational institutions established in 1958
1958 establishments in England